This is a list of 11 former provinces of the Democratic Republic of the Congo (from 1997 to 2015) by Human Development Index as of 2023 with data for the year 2021.

See also
List of countries by Human Development Index

References 

Congo, Democratic Republic of
Congo
Human Development Index